The Knight's Cross of the Iron Cross and its variants were the highest awards in the military and paramilitary forces of Nazi Germany during World War II. The Knight's Cross of the Iron Cross was awarded for a wide range of reasons and across all ranks, from a senior commander for skilled leadership of his troops in battle to a low-ranking soldier for a single act of extreme gallantry. A total of 7,321 awards were made between its first presentation on 30 September 1939 and its last bestowal on 17 June 1945. This number is based on the analysis and acceptance of the order commission of the Association of Knight's Cross Recipients (AKCR). Presentations were made to members of the three military branches of the Wehrmacht—the Heer (Army), Kriegsmarine (Navy) and Luftwaffe (Air Force)—as well as the Waffen-SS, the Reichsarbeitsdienst (RAD—Reich Labour Service) and the Volkssturm (German national militia). There were also 43 recipients in the military forces of allies of the Third Reich.

These recipients are listed in the 1986 edition of 's book,  — The Bearers of the Knight's Cross of the Iron Cross 1939–1945. Fellgiebel was the former chairman and head of the order commission of the AKCR. In 1996, the second edition of this book was published with an addendum delisting 11 of these original recipients. Author Veit Scherzer has cast doubt on a further 193 of these listings. The majority of the disputed recipients had received the award in 1945, when the deteriorating situation of Germany in the final days of World War II in Europe left a number of nominations incomplete and pending in various stages of the approval process.

Listed here are the 188 Knight's Cross recipients whose last name starts with "E". Scherzer has challenged the validity of three of these listings. The recipients are initially ordered alphabetically by last name. The rank listed is the recipient's rank at the time the Knight's Cross was awarded.

Background
The Knight's Cross of the Iron Cross and its higher grades were based on four separate enactments. The first enactment,  of 1 September 1939 instituted the Iron Cross, the Knight's Cross of the Iron Cross and the Grand Cross of the Iron Cross. Article 2 of the enactment mandated that the award of a higher class be preceded by the award of all preceding classes. As the war progressed, some of the recipients of the Knight's Cross distinguished themselves further and a higher grade, the Knight's Cross of the Iron Cross with Oak Leaves, was instituted. The Oak Leaves, as they were commonly referred to, were based on the enactment  of 3 June 1940. In 1941, two higher grades of the Knight's Cross were instituted. The enactment  of 28 September 1941 introduced the Knight's Cross of the Iron Cross with Oak Leaves and Swords and the Knight's Cross of the Iron Cross with Oak Leaves, Swords and Diamonds. At the end of 1944 the final grade, the Knight's Cross of the Iron Cross with Golden Oak Leaves, Swords, and Diamonds, based on the enactment  of 29 December 1944, became the final variant of the Knight's Cross authorized.

Recipients

The Oberkommando der Wehrmacht (Supreme Command of the Armed Forces) kept separate Knight's Cross lists, one for each of the three military branches, Heer (Army), Kriegsmarine (Navy), Luftwaffe (Air Force) and Waffen-SS. Within each of these lists a unique sequential number was assigned to each recipient. The same numbering paradigm was applied to the higher grades of the Knight's Cross, one list per grade. Of the 188 awards made to servicemen whose last name starts with "E", 22 were later awarded the Knight's Cross of the Iron Cross with Oak Leaves and two the Knight's Cross of the Iron Cross with Oak Leaves and Swords; eleven presentations were made posthumously. Heer members received 126 of the medals, six went to the Kriegsmarine, 41 to the Luftwaffe, and 15 to the Waffen-SS.

Notes

References

Citations

Bibliography

External links

Lists of Knight's Cross of the Iron Cross recipients
Cross symbols
Awards established in 1939
Military awards and decorations of Nazi Germany
Courage awards